Marieke Veltman (born September 18, 1971) is an American athlete. She competed in the women's long jump at the 1996 Summer Olympics.

References

External links
 

1971 births
Living people
Athletes (track and field) at the 1996 Summer Olympics
American female long jumpers
Olympic track and field athletes of the United States
Place of birth missing (living people)
21st-century American women